This is a list of yearly Interstate Intercollegiate Athletic Conference football standings.

Standings

References

Interstate Intercollegiate Athletic Conference
Standings